Kristiansand is a seaside resort city and municipality in Agder county, Norway. The city is the fifth-largest and the municipality the sixth-largest in Norway, with a population of around 112,000 as of January 2020, following the incorporation of the municipalities of Søgne and Songdalen into the greater Kristiansand municipality. In addition to the city itself, Statistics Norway counts four other densely populated areas in the municipality: Skålevik in Flekkerøy with a population of 3,526 in the Vågsbygd borough, Strai with a population of 1,636 in the Grim borough, Justvik with a population of 1,803 in the Lund borough, and Tveit with a population of 1,396 in the Oddernes borough. Kristiansand is divided into five boroughs: Grim, which is located northwest in Kristiansand with a population of 15,000; Kvadraturen, which is the centre and downtown Kristiansand with a population of 5,200; Lund, the second largest borough; Søgne, with a population of around 12,000 and incorporated into the municipality of Kristiansand as of January 2020; Oddernes, a borough located in the west; and Vågsbygd, the largest borough with a population of 36,000, located in the southwest.

Kristiansand is connected by four main roads: European Route E18 from Oslo, Aust-Agder and covers the eastern part of Kristiansand; European route E39 from Stavanger, Flekkefjord and the coast towns and villages in Vest-Agder; Norwegian National Road 9 from Evje, Setesdal and Grim; and Norwegian National Road 41 from Telemark, northern Aust-Agder, Birkeland, Tveit and the airport Kristiansand Airport, Kjevik. Varodd Bridge is a large bridge and a part of  E18, which stretches over Topdalsfjorden.

Tourism is important in Kristiansand, and the summer season is the most popular for tourists. Kristiansand Zoo and Amusement park is the largest zoo in Norway. It receives over 900,000 visitors every year. Markens Street is the main pedestrian street in downtown Kristiansand. Bystranda is a city beach located in Kvadraturen; Hamresanden beach is the longest beach in Kristiansand. Hamresanden Camping is a popular family camp during the summer season. The city hosts a free weekly concert in downtown Kristiansand in the summertime. Outside the city is the industrial park Sørlandsparken, which includes Sørlandssenteret, Norway's largest mall.

Name
The city is named after the Dano-Norwegian King King Christian IV, who founded it on 5 July 1641. The second part of the city's name, sand, refers to the sandy headland the city was built on (see also Lillesand).

The name was often written Christianssand until 1877, although the map of the mapmaker Pontoppidan from 1785 spelled the name Christiansand (with a single 's'). That year, an official spelling reform aimed at making city names "more Norwegian" changed it to Kristianssand. Kristiansund and Kristiania, now Oslo, had their spellings changed under the same reform. Despite that, a number of businesses and associations retain the "Ch" spelling. The name was again changed to its present form, Kristiansand (single "s"), in 1889.

In 2012, the city's mayor, Arvid Grundekjøn, proposed that the city be renamed Christianssand, arguing that "Kristiansand" is grammatically meaningless and that Christianssand stands for tradition. This proposal was not well received by the locals and the mayor has not pushed this further.

History

Prehistory and early history
The Kristiansand area has been inhabited since prehistoric times. In 1996, the well-preserved skeleton of a woman dating to approximately 6500 BC was discovered in Søgne in western Kristiansand. This demonstrates very early habitation of the archipelago. Grauthelleren (Grathelleren), located on Fidjane, is believed to be a Stone Age settlement. The first discovery in Norway of a Sarup enclosure (a Neolithic form of ritual enclosure first identified at Sarup on the Danish island of Funen) was made in 2010 at Hamresanden and dates to c. 3400 BC. Archaeological excavations to the east of Oddernes Church have uncovered rural settlements that existed during the centuries immediately before and after the start of the common era. Together with a corresponding discovery in Rogaland, these settlements are unique in the Norwegian context; isolated farms, rather than villages, were the norm in ancient Norway. Other discoveries in grave mounds around the church, in the Lund section of the city, indicate habitation beginning c. 400 AD, and 25 cooking pits that were found immediately outside the church wall in 1907 are probably even older. One of the largest pre-Christian burial grounds in South Norway was formerly located to the south and west of the church. A royal centre is thought to have existed at Oddernes before 800, and the church was built around 1040.

Before the stone church was built, one or perhaps two wooden post churches are believed to have stood on the same spot. A few years ago, excavations were carried out under and around the runestone when it was moved to the church porch; the grave finds indicated that the churchyard must already have been unusually large in the High Middle Ages. This means that the area must have had a large population before it was reduced by the Black Death.

In the 14th and 15th centuries, there was already a busy port and a small village on the Otra at the lowest point of today's Lund neighbourhood (Lahelle). Another important element in the development of Kristiansand was the harbor on the island of Flekkerøy, which was the most important on the Skagerrak beginning in the 16th century and was first fortified under King Christian III in 1555. In 1635, King Christian IV ordered his feudal seigneur, Palle Rosenkrantz, to move from Nedenes and build a royal palace on the island.

Foundation to 1900

Christian IV (renowned for having founded many towns) visited the location in 1630 and 1635, and on 5 July 1641 formally founded the town of Christianssand on the "sand" on the opposite bank of the Torridalselva (Otra). The town was laid out in Renaissance style on a grid plan (the central section now known as Kvadraturen = The Quarters), and merchants throughout Agder were commanded to move to the new town. In return, they were to receive a variety of trading privileges and a ten-year tax exemption.

In 1666, Christianssand became a garrison town and was heavily fortified. In 1682, King Christian V decided to relocate the bishopric there from Stavanger. Hence, the young city became the main city of the Christiansand Stift.

Christianssand experienced its first fire in 1734, which was devastating to the city. Later in the 18th century, after the American Revolutionary War, the town's shipbuilders experienced a boom that lasted until the Napoleonic Wars, when the continental blockade and naval warfare struck a severe blow to trade. Denmark–Norway supported France in the Wars and was therefore subjected to relentless attack by Britain, as recounted in Ibsen's Terje Vigen. Only in the 1830s did the economy begin to recover, and the growth in the Norwegian shipping industry was important for Christianssand. It was the only part of Norway where oak trees flourished, a major resource for the shipbuilding industry. Large numbers of lobsters were taken off the coast and sent to the London market by the mid 19th century. The population was about 12,000 by 1848.

The City of Kristiansand had a quarantine station for maritime traffic and hospital at Odderøy Island for cholera patients that opened in 1804.  The city had far fewer deaths than the surrounding area, largely attributable to the quarantine station and the hospital. For example, during the period of 1833–1866, Drammen had 544 cholera patients, of which 336 died. During this same period, Kristiansand only experienced 15 deaths from cholera.

Another important development during the 19th century was the foundation in 1881 of  Sindssygeasyl, the second central psychiatric institution in Norway (after Gaustad). The psychiatric hospital drew highly specialized doctors to the city and also provided many jobs for women.

The most recent major fire, in 1892, left half the original section of the city in ashes. It burned buildings as far as the cathedral, which had been rebuilt in brick after a previous fire in 1880.

1900 onward
With the development of hydropower in southern Norway, the city gradually developed an industrial base, particularly with the establishment in 1910 of the nickel refinery Kristiansands Nikkelraffineringsverk AS (later Falconbridge Nikkelverk, now Glencore Nikkelverk). From an economic perspective, the First World War was a good time for Kristiansand, as a neutral shipping city. The crises that followed with the gold standard politics of the 1920s and the world economic crisis of the 1930s were also deeply felt in a trading city like Kristiansand.

The labour movement had important pioneers in the city, and Leon Trotsky spent about a year of his exile in the archipelago offshore from Kristiansand. Arnulf Øverland took him from Randesund to Ny-Hellesund in Søgne in 1936. In the interwar period Kristiansand was a centre for intellectuals, especially after the architect Thilo Schoder settled there in 1932.

Kristiansand was attacked by German naval forces and the Luftwaffe during the Operation Weserübung on 9 April 1940. The naval forces met fierce resistance from Norwegian coastal artillery at Odderøya. Bombs and grenades also hit the downtown and the 70 meter high church tower of the Kristiansand Cathedral was hit by accident. The third attack attempt on the city succeeded because a signal flag was confused with a French national flag and the misunderstanding was not discovered until it was too late. The city was occupied by a force of 800 men.

Post-war construction included further development of the Lund section, and in the 1960s and 1970s Vågsbygd to the west was developed into a section with 20,000 inhabitants. In the 1980s, industry and business in the city declined, in part because of the 1986 fire at the Hotel Caledonien. But beginning in the second half of the 1990s, business increased in momentum with the development of enterprises for marine and offshore equipment, security technology and drilling.

The older municipal archives for Kristiansand (and the former municipalities) are currently held at the Inter-Municipal Archives in Vest-Agder (IKAVA). This includes documents concerning, for example, local councils, chairmanships, poor boards, school boards and archives including among other things personal documents in the form of client records, tax records, and also school records.

On 1 January 2020, the three neighbouring municipalities of Kristiansand, Songdalen, and Søgne were merged to form one large municipality called Kristiansand.

Coat-of-arms
The arms of Kristiansand were granted on 8 December 1909 and are based on the oldest seal of the city, dating from 1643. In 1643 King Christian IV granted the young town the right to use a seal with the Norwegian lion and the royal crown. The crown indicates that the city was founded by the king. The other major element in the arms is a tree. As the species of tree is not specified, there are several known versions with differently shaped trees. A second seal, from 1658, shows a tree with leaves and what look like pine cones. On the base of the crown are the letters R. F. P., standing for Regna Firma Pietas, "Piety strengthens the realm"; this was Christian IV's motto. Around the seal of the city is its motto, Cavsa Triumphat Tandem Bona, "A good cause prevails in the end".

Geography
Kristiansand is strategically located on the Skagerrak, and until the opening of the Kiel Canal between the North Sea and the Baltic was very important militarily and geopolitically. This meant that for centuries it served as a military stronghold, first as Harald Fairhair's royal residence, then as a Danish-Norwegian fortress, and later as a garrison town. Kristiansand is a gateway to and from the continent, with ferry service to Denmark and a terminus of the railway line along the southern edge of South Norway.Geologically, this part of Agder is part of the Swedo-Norwegian Base Mountain Shield, the southwestern section of the Baltic Shield, and consists of two main geological formations of Proterozoic rocks that were formed in the Gothic and later Swedo-Norwegian orogenies, with significant metamorphism during the latter. There is a substrate of 1,600–1,450 million-year-old slate, quartzite, marble and amphibolite with some hornblende gneiss, and overlaid on this acidic surface structures of both granite  and granodiorite (in general 1,250–1,000 million years old, in some places 1,550–1,480 million years old). The Bamblefelt geological area starts to the east of the municipality and extends to Grenland.

The last Swedo-Norwegian formations are evident in large formations of granite. There are also incidences of gabbro and diorite, less commonly eclogite. The Caledonian orogeny  did not affect this area. Faults run southwest–northeast.

Near the city, there are deep woods. In Baneheia and at the former coastal artillery fortress on Odderøya, there are lighted ski trails and walking paths specially prepared for wheelchair users.

Two major rivers, the Otra and the Tovdalselva, flow into the Skagerrak at Kristiansand.

Climate
Kristiansand has a temperate oceanic climate (Köppen: Cfb) in the 1991-2020 period. The coastal parts of the Skagerrak coast, which includes Kristiansand, is the sunniest part of Norway. Snow generally occurs in late December and in January and February; it may be heavy (the snow record at Kjevik airport is ) but rarely stays long on the coast; see Climate of Norway. Due to warming in the more recent decades, snow often melts after a few days.
In the summer most locals go to the Fiskebrygga, the archipelago opposite the city, and Hamresanden Beach, which is located about 10 minutes from the city centre near Kjevik airport. People from Denmark, Sweden, Germany, the UK and other European countries also visit this beach in the summer during their travels.

The all-time high  at Kristiansand airport was recorded August 1975. The all-time low at the airport  was recorded January 1982. The temperature seldom reaches , but most days in July reaches  or more. The warmest month ever was July 1901 with mean  at an earlier weather station (Kristiansand S - Eg). The warmest month at the airport was July 2018 with 24-hr average  and average daily high . July 2018 was also the sunniest month on record with 422 sunhours, and the year 2018 recorded 2126 sunhours - despite December recording just 1 sunhr as cloudiest month on record in Kristiansand. The cloudiest July recorded 156 sunhours (2007).  Kristiansand has the national record for the sunniest February (153 sunhrs in 1986), sunniest April (323 hrs in 2021), sunniest August (343 hrs in 1995) and sunniest September (241 hrs in 1959).
The wettest month on record was October 1976 with 560 mm precipitation, and the driest was April 1974 with no precipitation at all.

Popular beaches

Bystranda is a beach located at the city centre. It is east on Kvadraturen and at Tangen. Nearby the beach is the swimming complex Aquarama with both outdoor and indoor pools. Aquarama is next door to the "Scandic Hotel Bystranda", which is Southern Norway's largest hotel. Some of Kristiansand's most expensive apartments are located east of the beach and near to Tangen. Some of Bystranda's facilities are beach volleyball, playgrounds, skateparks, stairs to the water at deeper ground and its easy design for handicapped people and children. In the middle of the bay, there is a sculpture in the water. Palmesus is a yearly beach festival held on Bystranda, it is Scandinavia's largest beach festival.
Hamresanden is located between Hånes and the airport Kristiansand Airport, Kjevik. There are three camping places and an apartment hotel at the beach. The name comes from the nearby subpart Hamre.
Sømstranda is a nudist beach in Kristiansand located at Søm.

Boroughs

Parts

Kristiansand is partitioned into 18 parts and 217 subparts. Kristiansand is also divided into 5 boroughs.

Kvadraturen is  the city center of Kristiansand. The area belonged to the farms  and Grim, and was a sandy plain covered with forest, and was called Sanden or Grimsmoen. Settlements were before the city was founded focused on loading and dumps at Lund, along Otra or Torridalselven and along Topdalsfjorden by Odderøya and Flekkeroy port. 
Christian IV's town plan outlined the city center with 56 rectangular squares with five long blocks and eight cross streets. It was the squares along the Otra and east and west harbor, which was built first. 
Today Kvadraturen is a part of Kvadraturen/, which has (as of 1 January 2005) 5510 inhabitants. The area Posebyen in Kvadraturen is Northern Europe's longest continuous wooden buildings. 
In the parts are among others Kristiansand Cathedral, Kristiansand City Hall, Wergeland Park, and the terminal for ferries to Hirtshals and Kristiansand Station is located in the parts western corner.
Vågsbygd has considerable industry, who has survived major changes. The largest employer is all the same Elkem Solar producing super clean Silicon for solar cells, which are located in premises that Elkem previous Ferrosilicon factory Fiskå Verk. On Andøya it established a significant and advanced mechanical industry which produces offshore and marine cranes and other marine equipment in Andøya Industrial Park. Amfi Vågsbygd is a major shopping center in Vågsbygd. Outside of Andøya in Vågsbygd is Bredalsholmen Shipyard and Preservation Centre, a Centre for protection of vessels at the former Bredalsholmen yard. Bredalsholmen Shipyard and Preservation Centre is a national hub for maintenance of museum ships and cherish worthy coastal culture, and a drydock with considerable capacity.

Lund is the second largest borough in Kristiansand with a population of 9,000 inhabitants in 2012. 14 June 1921 was the first 2.75 km2 of Lund transferred to Kristiansand and 1 January 1965 was also the rest of Lund part of Kristiansand in the municipal amalgamation. In Lund, there are traces of humans dating back to the early Iron Age, the Viking Age until the early Middle Ages various locations. There has been a settlement here since the Stone Age. During the Viking Age there was a great man's farm here. A Runestone at Oddernes church provides a connection to this farm. A large field with burial mounds formerly existed south and west of the church, and may also be associated with this farm. In 1492 robbers from the sea came and attacked Lund. This is mentioned in two letters located in the National Archives. The letters describe the attack that took place with a lot of violence against both women and men and that on both sides suffered casualties. No one know who the robbers were, but their centurion was named Per Syvertsen. The name suggests that he and his crew came from Norway or Denmark.

Indre and Ytre Randesund is located between Kvåsefjorden in Høvåg and the Topdalsfjord in Oddernes. Several small islands are situated alongside the cost of Randesund, among them Randøya and Herøya, both popular with summer tourists. The municipality (originally the parish) is named after the island, Randøen (now known as Randøya). The first part of the name is rand (Old Norse: rǫnd) which means "boundary" or "edge" and the last part of the name is sund which means "strait". The name was previously spelled Randøsund.

Tveit is a village and a former municipality in Vest-Agder county. It is located in the present-day municipality of Kristiansand. Tveit is home to Kristiansand Airport, Kjevik. Tveit is located along the lower part of the Tovdalselva river, known as Topdalselva from the border with Aust-Agder. The population of Tveit is approximately 2,900 (2014).

Subparts

Some of the most populous basic unions in the following boroughs:

Søgne 

Søgne was a former municipality, located west of Kristiansand. The municipality was merged into a large municipality with the former municipality of Songdalen and the city of Kristiansand on January 1, 2020.

Songdalen 

Songdalen was a former municipality, located northwest of Kristiansand. The municipality was merged into a large municipality with the former municipality of Søgne and the city of Kristiansand on January 1, 2020.

Notable streets

Dronningens gate (Queens street) is a street that has its run from Havnegata Vestre harbor to Lund Bridge and is 980 meters long. 86 properties are matrikulert to the street. The street had in the 1700s the name Sand Alley.
Elvegata (River street) has its run from Østre Strandgate to Tordenskjolds gate. It has a mix of newer business and residential buildings  schools and nursing homes as well as a large percentage of older residential buildings in wood and masonry. On the south side of Østre Strandgate called extension of Elvegata for Tangen. 70 meters of the street, in the quarter between Dronningens gate and Tollbodgata is designated county road 26.
Festningsgata is a street in Kvadraturen. The name is connected with Christiansholm Fortress from 1672 located in the street race extension towards the east harbor. The street stretches from Østre Strandgate to Tordenskjoldsgate and originally had the name Northern gate. The extension of the street during north of Tordenskjolds street is named Stener Heyerdahl street. The park south of Tordenskjolds street called Stener Heyerdahl park. This street stump and Festningsgata from Tordenskjolds street to Dronningens gate is part of the county road 28. From Vestre Strandgata to Tollbodgata buildings are listed by the walled green was introduced immediately after the fire in 1892 and forward.
Henrik Wergelands gate is a street in Kvadraturen in Kristiansand. The street has its run from Vestre Strandgate to Elvegata. 118 properties are matrikulert to the street. It had previously named Consumer Julia Street. The street is named in honor of Norwegian poet Henrik Wergeland. In 1808 he had his early childhood in the town until he at nine moved with her family to Eidsvold.
Tollbodgata (Tollbooth street) has its run from Senior wharf at Vestre port to Elvegata by Otra and is identical with Route 27 in Vest-Agder. 77 properties are matrikulert to the street. The street has previously had the name Sten Alley. Tolbooth.
Vestre Strandgate (Western Beach Street) is a street that has its run from Gravane to roundabout at Gartnerløkka where it meets E18 and continue to run in Rv9 (Setesdalsveien). It is part of the county road 471 from the roundabout at Gartnerløkka the junction with Dronnings gata. From Rådhusgata to Gravane has two parallel paths, an extension of Fv471 and a container that separates the harbor from including Tolbooth. The street has a number of key meeting places and city functions in terms of Radisson Hotel, Agder Theater, cinema, Clarion Hotel, Kristiansand Bus Terminal and Kristiansand Station. The street is characterized by restaurants, pubs and eating places, a number of shops and offices and a few apartments.

Government
All municipalities in Norway, including Kristiansand, are responsible for primary education (through 10th grade), outpatient health services, senior citizen services, unemployment and other social services, zoning, economic development, and municipal roads.  The municipality is governed by a municipal council of elected representatives, which in turn elects a mayor. Kristiansand has no local parliamentary government, but is managed by the municipal council and an executive committee. The mayor is the spokesman for the city, head of the council and leader of the executive committee. In Kristiansand the mayor has represented the center-right parties since the late 1940s. The municipality falls under the Kristiansand District Court and the Agder Court of Appeal.

Municipal council
The municipal council  of Kristiansand is made up of 71 representatives that are elected to four year terms.  The party breakdown of the council is as follows:

Demographics

Kristiansand has the third largest Vietnamese community in Norway.

Religion

Christianity

Kristiansand Cathedral is the largest church in Kristiansand. It is located in Kvadraturen with the town hall and Wergelandsparken. The church was built in 1885 and have the capacity of 1500 people. The church is the seat of the Bishop of Agder and Telemark in the Church of Norway. Grim Church was built in 1969 and has a capacity of 750 people. Vågsbygd Church is the church of Vågsbygd, it is located in the centrum of Vågsbygd and was built in 1967 and has a capacity of 650. Lund Church was built in 1987 and has a capacity of 600 people. Søm Church was built in 2004 and has a capacity of 600. The church was Kristiansand municipality 1000 year building and is the largest church in Oddernes. The windows of Søm Church was designed by Kjell Nupen.

There are also churches located at Flekkerøy, Hellemyr, Hånes, Justvik, Oddemarka (Oddernes), Randesund, Strai (Torridal), Tveit and Voie. There are chapeaus all over the city. Christianity are strongest in Flekkerøy and Søm, even though Southern Norway is called the Norwegian Bible belt, Christianity doesn't play a big part in the rest of the city.

There is a Catholic church in Kvadraturen, St. Ansgar's Church. At Slettheia, there is a Latter-day Saint church and at Tinnheia, there is an Orthodox church.

The Church of Norway has twelve parishes (sokn) within the municipality of Kristiansand. It is part of the Kristiansand arch-deanery in the Diocese of Agder og Telemark.

Buddhism

There is a Buddhist centre in Vågsbygd with Ternevig. There is also a Buddhist meditation centre located in the neighbouring municipality Songdalen.

Islam

There is a mosque in Kvadraturen.

Economy

Christianssands Bryggeri is a producer of beer and soft drinks with a long history in the city. The brewery was established in 1859, and all products are made with spring water from the company's own spring, called Christian IVs kilde (Christian IV's spring).

Hennig-Olsen is an ice cream factory with headquarters and manufacturing facilities in Kristiansand. The factory opened in 1960, but the Hennig-Olsen family has produced ice cream in Kristiansand since 1924, when Sven Hennig-Olsen started doing so in the back of his tobacco kiosk.

Glencore Nikkelverk (nickel factory) was founded in 1910 as Kristiansand Nikkelraffineringsverk A/S. The company is owned by the Anglo-Swiss company Glencore and has about 500 employees.

The Korsvik industrial area on the east side of the Kristiansandsfjord is home to companies working on drilling technology, cranes, winches and other equipment for the worldwide petroleum industry, among them National Oilwell Varco and Aker MH.
Elkem, owned by China National Bluestar since 2011, operated a refining plant for ferrosilicon and microsilica at Fiskå in Vågsbygd for many years and was replaced in the beginning of the 20th century by Elkem Solar which produces polycrystalline silicon for wafers used in the solar cell industry. It has about 225 employees.

Sørlandschips is a Norwegian produced crisps brand. The potatoes often come from Denmark. Sørlandschips owned by Scandza AS and is one of Norway's most popular potato chip brands today. It has a variety of tastes and spices.

Dampbageriet is a large bakery chain based in Vest-Agder, it was established in Kristiansand in 1862 and has 4 stores in Kristiansand.

Sparebanken Sør is a savings bank serving Vest-Agder, Aust-Agder and Telemark. It was established in 1824 when Christiansand Sparebank opened up, it was one of the first in Norway.

Hennig-Olsen Iskremfabrikk is a major Norwegian ice-cream company based and started up in Kristiansand. The factory is located in Hannevika.

As a relatively large shipping town, Kristiansand was a profitable location for shipbuilders Kristiansands Mekaniske Verksted and P. Høivolds Mekaniske Verksted. At one time, shipping companies were the backbone of the local economy, but not many survive. The Rasmussen Group, previously a shipping firm, is now an investment company. Kristiansand continues to have major shipbuilding and repair facilities that support Norway's North Sea oil industry. The static inverter plant of the HVDC Cross-Skagerrak is located near Kristiansand.

Kristiansand Dyrepark is the zoo that sells most giraffe in Europe.

Sørlandsparken

Sørlandsparken (The Southern Norway Park) is an industrial shopping park outside of Kristiansand city in the municipality. The park is also 17 kilometers from Lillesand.

The main part of the industrial park is in Kristiansand, including the mall Sørlandssenteret with 195 stores and Kristiansand Zoo, it is the largest mall and zoo in Norway. The racetrack of Southern Norway is also located in Kristiansand while IKEA is located technically in Lillesand municipality.

Others large chainstores is also located around the mall.

There are two hotels located in Sørlandsparken and some resorts nearby the zoo.

E18 goes past Sørlandsparken before continuing to downtown Kristiansand. Buses are available 6-8 times in the hours all day.

Culture

The Kristiansand Symphony Orchestra, Chamber Orchestra and Wind Ensemble merged in 2003. The orchestra now performs at the Kilden Performing Arts Centre, which opened in January 2012. This is also the new home of Agder Theatre, founded in 1991.

Sørlandets Art Museum is in the centre of Kristiansand, in the former buildings of the cathedral school. It was established in 1995 building on the former collection of Christiansands billedgalleri, and is the second-largest regional art museum in Norway. It includes both fine art and crafts and runs an extensive programme of activities that includes exhibitions of the permanent collection, temporary exhibitions of contemporary art, and touring exhibitions to schools and child-care facilities.

The association began assembling a permanent collection in 1902; this is now housed in Sørlandets Art Museum.

Cultiva, a local foundation, was established to ensure a portion of the profits made from selling shares in Agder Energy Ltd have lasting benefits to the community, focusing on art, culture, creativity and building competence; it supported projects in Kristiansand until the financial crisis forced cut-backs in 2011. In addition the Norwegian Directorate for Cultural Heritage endowed a cultural free port, Porto Rico, as one of the pilot projects of its "value creation project" in the 2000s.

In 2007 Kristiansand was awarded the designation Norges kulturkommune (Norway's culture municipality), a distinction awarded every other year by the Norwegian Culture Forum.

Fiskebrygga is a former fish landing on either side of the Gravane Canal, which separates the city centre from Odderøya; it was refurbished in the 1990s and now has wood-fronted buildings housing restaurants and shops including a fish market. It is very popular in summer, when the canal is also heavily used by boats.

The island of Odderøya is a former fortress and quarantine station, now used for recreation and excursion purposes. At times there are also concerts and festivals on the island.

The municipality millennium is Tresse - Retranchement, the city party space in front of Christiansholm Fortress, bottom Festningsgata the Baltic sea. The millennium was celebrated here include a large sign. A small sign to mark the Millennium for the future are made, but per. 2011 not installed in anticipation of the festival grounds shall be given a facelift. It should also dug a channel within the fortress, so this again is left on an island. These projects are waiting for political consideration and funding. Tusenårstreet were planted on the lawn between the festival grounds and playground/ice rink in Tresse.

Sport

The city's best known football team, IK Start, moved in 2007 to a new home stadium, Sør Arena. The city is also home to other football teams, including Flekkerøy IL, FK Vigør, IK Våg, and FK Donn.

Kristiansand is also known for its handball teams (Kristiansands IF and Vipers Kristiansand), ice hockey (Kristiansand Ishockeyklubb), basketball (Kristiansand Pirates) and volleyball (Grim VBK) clubs and has a baseball team (Kristiansand Suns).

Tourism

Kristiansand is a summer tourist destination, attracting many visitors in particular to its zoo, Kristiansand Zoo and Amusement Park, just east of the city. This is the second most visited attraction in Norway, after Holmenkollen, and had 925,000 visitors in 2012. Its animals, most of which are housed in natural habitats, include wolves, tigers, lions and the lynx. The zoo is open 365 days a year, while the amusement park is open during the summer season only.

The Quart festival was an annual music festival that took place in Kristiansand over five days in early July. There were large stages on Odderøya and smaller venues around the city. Founded in 1991 as Qvadradurmusivalen, the festival changed its name to the more catchy Quart Festival the following year. It included internationally known performers and was also known for booking acts that later became internationally known. For several years it was the largest music festival in Norway, but beginning in summer 2007 it was challenged by the Hovefestivalen on Tromøya, Arendal, and some Oslo-based festivals. In early June 2008 the organization declared bankruptcy; the festival returned in 2009 under the name Quart, but again went bankrupt.

Kristiansand is home to many other festivals as well, running throughout the year. Protestfestival, held in September, was launched in 2000 and aims to address apathy and indifference in politics, and includes debates, concerts and lectures combined with performance art and documentaries. Protestfestival claims to attract anarchists, communists, hippies as well as conservative Christians and capitalists and to encourage communication among these radically different groups. Others include Southern Discomfort, also in September, the Bragdøya Blues Festival in June, the Dark Season Festival in October, and Cultural Night and the International Children's Film Festival in April.

Crime

Kristiansand has three police stations. The one in the city center, the main one for Southern Norway, Agder Police District. While on less serious crimes only covers some these parts of Kristiansand,  Kvadraturen, Grim and Lund. Vågsbygd police station covers the Vågsbygd district while Randesund police station covers Randesund, Søm, Hånes and Tveit.

Most crim-cases reported in Kristiansand takes place on Kvadraturen. In south of Markens gate with Tollbodgata and Dronningens gate which host stores that are open 24 hours as well as many nightclubs. In 2014 it was most reported cases there in the entire city.

There were over 56 cases reported in this area and 123 on Kvadraturen in 2013, a decrease from 150 cases in 2012 reported on Kvadraturen. In the Vågsbygd police district it was reported that there were over 50 cases, going down 27% since 2012. At Randesund police station it was 61 cases reported, so had gone down 9% from 2012 to 2013. Outside of Kvadraturen, Vågsbygd and Randesund there were 110 cases reported in the municipality, mostly from Grim.

, there were over 350 cases reported for all of Kristiansand. Of these, 34% were committed by minors on Kvadraturen. Most cases on Kvadraturen are narcotics, violence and nonprofit crimes; the majority being shop lifting. Six of the violent crime cases were against police and most violent acts were performed with knives.

Minors

In crime performed by people under 18, there were most reported 16-year-old boys in 2013. Although adding the numbers of boys and girls together, the largest number of crime for the age was 14. It is simultaneously more that reports a mixed sex image where girls show an equal activity as boys. Some Instead there are also girls who are leading the way. Several executives tells increased used of bullying, intimidation and violence among girls. It looks including out that girls make greater use of social media such behavior. Some also report increased cannabis use among girls. The figures from the police show that nearly one in three young people who commit crimes have minority backgrounds. Of the 163 youths who embarked offense first half is 47 immigrants or Norwegian-born to immigrant parents. This represents 29% of the total number. The decline in the number of young offenders apply primarily the oldest group from 15 to 17 years. Kristiansand has several 14-year-olds than 17-year-olds who commit offenses. Girls make up more current through increased use of threats and violence.

Contact from Voiebyen, Vågsbygd, Grim, Søm and Lund expressed concern about boys who challenge them with their behavior by breaking rules, commit vandalism, threaten classmates and try out various drugs. One of the schools have also been several incidents of violence against teachers and classmates. It is composed issues related to several of these students and they have various reasons major challenges in adapting to school requirements and expectations. Several executives from schools stated that they experience an increase in the number of pupils, both boys and girls, who are struggling mentally. They mention students with depression, social anxiety, eating disorder, self-mutilation and sleep problems. This worries them and they fear that some of these students, as a result of their poor mental health, are more vulnerable to make choices that can lead them into the environment with drugs and crime. To meet these challenges and provide these young people needed and customized follow-up, it is crucial to have a holistic focus and a good interdepartmental and interdisciplinary collaboration.

Health

Sørlandet Sykehus HF is a hospital group in Southern Norway, they have three hospitals in Flekkefjord, Arendal and the main one on Eg in Kristiansand. It is only a 6 minutes drive from the city centrum Kvadraturen. The headquarter of Sørlandet Sykehus HF is also located in Kristiansand. The hospital has departments in Vågsbygd and Oddernes.

Eg hospital is an asylum/psychiatric hospital next to Sørlandet hospital. It was opened in 1881 by dr. Axel H. Lindboe, this became Norway's third insane asylum.

St. Josef hospital was a catholic hospital located at Kvadraturen, it was opened in 1885 and driven by his sisters. The hospital closed down in 1967.

There are 11 retirement homes in Kristiansand and most of them are located on Kvadraturen. One rehabilitation center, ca 15 fitness centers, 20 dentist offices, 10 medical centers and around 25 pharmacies.

Transportation

Kristiansand is an important transport and communications node, connected to continental Europe by air and sea.

Sea
From the city centre, the ferry harbour has routes to Hirtshals (Denmark) operated by both Color Line and Fjord Line. Color Line operates their MS Superspeed 1, which entered into service in 2008 and spends approximately 3 hours and 15 minutes on the crossing. The route operates year-round with two crossings each way in one day. Fjord Line operates HSC Fjord Cat, which is a high-speed catamaran covering the route in around 2 hours and 15 minutes. The ship was built between 1997 and 1998, and has sailed under several different operators on many different routes. It only operates during the high season in the summer.

A new catamaran built by Australian shipbuilding company Austal will enter service at the start of summer 2020 and replace Fjord Cat. The new ship should double the capacity, while retaining the same travel duration of 2 hours and 15 minutes. Fjord Line also aims for the new ship to address complaints with seaworthiness and stability from its predecessor.

On 7 April 2022, a direct cruise-ferry service began with Eemshaven, Netherlands, operated by startup company Holland Norway Lines.

Road
European Road 18 is the largest highway in Kristiansand. It starts after E39 goes to Denmark before the city bridge on Kvadraturen. E18 continues out Kristiansand municipality and through Arendal, Oslo and ends in Stockholm. European Road 39 starts in Trondheim and has it course through Western Norway before following the coastal municipalities in Vest-Agder. When E39 comes to Kristiansand, it goes to the harbor and continues through Denmark. Norwegian National Road 9 is a road starting in Kristiansand, through Grim and then through Vennesla municipality before leaving Vest-Agder. The national road ends in Telemark at Haukeli, and is the most important road connection for Setesdalen and the surrounding regions.

Norwegian National Road 41
Norwegian National Road 41 starts in Hånes. It is the road out to Kristiansand Airport, Kjevik, it continues to Birkenes and ends in Kviteseid, Telemark. County road 401 is the old E18 before it got upgraded. It starts on Søm and ends in Lillesand, it goes via Høvåg. County road 452 is the old road to Vennesla city centrum. It starts on Lund, then goes through Justvik and Ålefjær before Vennesla municipality. County road 456 is the main road in Vågsbygd and afterwards ending in Søgne. County road 457 takes up from 456 in Voiebyen and ends at Flekkerøy. County road 471 is the largest road in downtown Kristiansand. It ends at Lund and goes besides the university.

Bus
Buses in the city and surrounding region are operated by Boreal Buss AS, who won the tender from Agder Kollektivtrafikk in 2018 to operate routes for seven years, with an option to extend the period by three years. Previously, Nettbuss Sør (South) operated buses in the region for eight years from 2010 to 2018. All regional bus lines goes through three stops in Kvadraturen. Some bus lines goes vice versa from the west coast to the east coast of the city.

Kristiansand Bus Terminal or Kristiansand Rutebilstasjon is the main bus terminal for the city, and also acts as a hub for express-buses connecting to Oslo, Stavanger and Haukeli. It is located by the train station Kristiansand S. The bus terminal has local, regional and long-distance bus routes. A new bus terminal was constructed in 2019, replacing the old and outdated building from 1960. The old terminal will be demolished and replaced by a small park and green-space.

The local city buses in Kristiansand has their main stop in Kvadraturen with city terminals in the streets Henrik Wergelands gate (eastbond or end for westbound) and Tollbodgata (westbound or end for eastbound), both streets crosses Markens gate. City bus lines 01, A1 starts in Kvadraturen and goes by UiA and Rona. M1, M2, M3, 12, goes by Vågsbygd centrum. 17, 18 joins M1, M2, M3 and 12 for Hannevika. 40, 42, 50 and 45, 46 goes only Hannevika. Line 40, 42, 45, 46 and 50 stops in Kristiansand Bus Terminal expect in the rush hours, while M1, M2, M3, 12, 17 and 18 continues to Henrik Wergelands gate, UiA, Rona, then their destinations. Line 13, 15, 19, 32 and 30 comes north for Kvadraturen and goes by Grim torv. Line  22, 23 only goes by UiA. Line 31 goes  Line 35, 36 and 37 goes by Ve, Rona, UiA, Tollbodgata and ends in Kristiansand Bus Terminal. There are also local buses in some of the boroughs like Vågsbygd: Line 51, 52 and 55 goes from neighbourhoods in the borough to Vågsbygd centrum collaborating with M1 or M2 at selective times. Line 57 goes from east to west on the main road in Flekkerøy. Line 58 goes locally in Randesund to Rona.

Railway
Kristiansand Station opened in 1895 and is located in the city centre, close to the ferry terminal. It is owned by Norwegian National Rail Administration. The Sørlandet Line goes through small towns in Vest-Agder and Aust-Agder counties. Express trains go east to Oslo S. Regional lines goes to Stavanger.

Aviation
A new one-storey parking garage was constructed in 2019.

Travel distances
Distance from Kristiansand to other cities:
 Mandal 36 kilometers (23 miles) (considerably shortened when new E39 opens in 2022)
 Evje 49 kilometers (30 miles)
 Arendal 55 kilometers (34 miles)
 Flekkefjord 81 kilometers (50 miles)
 Stavanger 160 kilometers (100 miles)
 Oslo 250 kilometers (155 miles) 
 Bergen 292 kilometers (181 miles)
 Trondheim 601 kilometers (373 miles)
 Tromsø 1382 kilometers (859 miles)
 Copenhagen 391 kilometers (243 miles)
 Stockholm 768 kilometers (477 miles)

Education
 The University of Agder was established in 2007, based on Agder College, which had been founded in 1994 by the amalgamation of six previous institutions: Kristiansand Teacher Training College, Agder District College, Kristiansand College of Nursing, Arendal College of Nursing, Agder Engineering and District College (Grimstad) and Agder Conservatory of Music. The university has about 10,000 students, of whom 7,500 are in Kristiansand and the remaining 2,500 in Grimstad. In Kristiansand it is housed on a campus on the former parade ground of Gimlemoen in the Lund section. The university offers a wide range of studies at all levels, organised into five faculties: Humanities and Education, Engineering and Science, Health and Sport, Economics and Social Sciences, and Fine Arts. Gimlemoen is also the site of Sørlandet kunnskapspark, a research park built with funds from sources including the Cultiva foundation that houses a number of companies with a degree of professional affiliation with the university, such as Agderforskning, a social science research institute that is part of the publishing company Cappelen Damm.

Noroff University College was established in 2012 and is a private university offering specialised degrees two in Interactive media  (Games or Animation) and Applied Data Science and in Digital Forensics. The University College builds on Noroff's existing vocational school which originally opened in 1987. In addition to the Kristiansand Campus Noroff has facilities in Oslo, Bergen and Stavanger. Noroff has considerable experience in offering online courses and all of the degree courses offered at the University College are available online.

Kristiansand was a garrison and cathedral town from 1664; Kristiansand Cathedral School was founded in 1684 and a Latin school in 1734. There are currently four public senior secondary schools: Kristiansand Cathedral School Gimle, Vågsbygd High School, Kvadraturen skolesenter and Tangen High School

Private senior secondary schools include Sonans utdanning (education). The private school Sørlandets Maritime Senior Secondary School is also based in Kristiansand. This school offers two courses of study, Technology and Industrial Production and maritime subjects. It is a boarding school; students live and undergo training aboard the training ship MS Sjøkurs, a steamer that previously operated on the Hurtigruten.

Kristiansand is also host to an International School on Kongsgård Alle in Lund. The School opened in January 2008 to provide an international education through English to students from grade 1 to grade 10.  This IB authorised school moved into a brand new purpose built building in Summer 2014, to house the expanding school which now has over 100 students.

List of schools in Kristiansand

Media

Fædrelandsvennen is the main news paper in Kristiansand and the Kristiansand Region. The paper has around 116 000 readers every day and was founded in 1875. From 2006, the newspaper went from broadsheet to tabloid. Fædrelandsvennen was located at Rådhusgata with Wergelandsparken (A park named after Henrik Wergeland) until 02.27.192 when someone blew up the building and it burned down to the ground. Nobody lost their lives in the incident. The newspaper relocated to Fiskåtangen in Vågsbygd where it located until 2015 when it moved back downtown to Henrik Wergelands gate. Fædrelandsvennen have ownership in many Southern Norway based newspapers, TV-Channels radio stations and other companies.

Kristiansand Avis (Kristiansand Newspaper) is a free newspaper paid by ads, and is delivered to all households in the region except Lillesand, Birkenes and Iveland. The newspaper is focused on staying closed to the local people. It comes out each Thursday and had 45 000 readers in 2014.

NRK Sørlandet has their main office in Kristiansand. It is the district office for the national broadcasting channel NRK. NRK Sørlandet covers Aust-Agder and Vest-Agder County. They produce 6 hours of radio and one and a half hour of television, in addition to their own website for news for Southern Norway.

Notable people

Education 
 Haldur Grüner (1818–1858), business school founder

Public Service & public thinking 
 Syvert Omundsen Eeg (1757–1838) farmer and rep. the Norwegian Constitutional Assembly
 Marcus Gjøe Rosenkrantz (1762–1838) a Government Minister and Member of Parliament
 Nicolai Wergeland (1780–1848) a Norwegian priest, writer and politician
 Jens Lauritz Arup (1793–1874) a Norwegian bishop and politician
 Hans Christian Petersen (1793–1862) de facto Prime Minister of Norway 1858 to 1861
 Jacob von der Lippe (1797–1878) a Norwegian politician and priest
 Camilla Collett (1813–1895) said to be Norway's first feminist and writer
 Herman Wedel Major (1814–1854) psychiatrist, founded the Gaustad Hospital
 Joseph Frantz Oscar Wergeland (1815–1895) military officer, cartographer and skiing pioneer
 Einar Rosenqvist (1817–1885) a Norwegian naval officer and politician
 Valdemar Knudsen (1819–1898) sugarcane plantation pioneer on West Kauai, Hawaii
 Jens Peter Broch (1819–1886) an orientalist and linguist in Semitic languages
 Sofus Arctander (1845-1924) a politician, acting Prime Minister of Norway, 1905
 William Brede Kristensen (1867–1953) Dutch theologian, professor and church historian
 Theo Sørensen (1873–1959) a missionary, worked in Tibet
 Finn Støren (1893–1962) a businessperson and civil servant for Nasjonal Samling
 Arvid G. Hansen (1894-1966) a politician, associated first with the Labour Party, then the Communist Party
 Gabriel Langfeldt (1895–1983) a Norwegian psychiatrist and academic
 Bernt Balchen (1899–1973) pioneer polar aviator, navigator & aircraft mechanical engineer
 Ole Wehus (1909–1947) a Norwegian Nasjonal Samling police official 
 Leo Tallaksen (1908–1983) a politician, twice Mayor of Kristiansand
 Bjørn Egge CBE (1918–2007) a Major General of the Norwegian Army
 Jan Vincents Johannessen (born 1941) a physician, cancer researcher, painter and composer
 Tor Fuglevik (born 1950) a Norwegian radio and TV executive
 Anne Berit Andersen (born 1951) a Norwegian politician, Mayor of Søgne 1991 to 2001
 Terje G. Simonsen (born 1963) a Norwegian historian and nonfiction author
 Harald Furre (born 1964) an economist and Mayor of Kristiansand 2015–2019
 Marie Benedicte Bjørnland (born 1965) head of Norwegian Police Security Service 2012/2019.
 Nicolai Tangen (born 1966), hedge fund manager and philanthropist
 Mette-Marit, Crown Princess of Norway (born 1972), the crown princess of Norway, married Crown Prince Haakon in 2001.

The Arts 
 Henrik Wergeland (1808–1845) writer, poet, playwright, polemicist, historian and linguist
 Dan Weggeland (1827–1918) an artist and teacher, the "Father of Utah Art"
 Anton Jörgen Andersen (1845–1926) a Norwegian composer and cellist
 Octavia Sperati (1847–1918) a Norwegian actress
 Gerhard Schjelderup (1859–1933) a Norwegian composer of operas
 Oskar Textorius (1864-1938) a Swedish actor, singer and theater director
 Nils Hald (1897–1963) a Norwegian actor
 Ellen Isefiær (1899–1985) a Norwegian actress and stage director
 Jens Bjørneboe (1920–1976), a novelist, writer and painter
 Else Marie Jakobsen (1927–2012), a textile artist and designer
 Finn Benestad (1929–2012) a Norwegian musicologist, music critic and academic
 Eva Margot (1944-2019), a painter used realism, symbolism and abstract styles
 Terje Formoe, (born 1949) a singer, songwriter and actor
 Rolf Løvland (born 1955) a Norwegian composer, lyricist, arranger and pianist
 Terje Dragseth (born 1955) a Norwegian poet, author and film director
 Kjell Nupen (1955–2014) a contemporary artist; painter, sculptor and graphic artist
 Hilde Hefte (born 1956), a jazz singer
 Bjørn Ole Rasch (born 1959) a keyboard performer, composer, arranger and academic
 Sigurd Køhn (1959–2004) a Norwegian jazz saxophonist and composer
 Arne Hjeltnes (born 1963) a Norwegian writer and TV personality
 Per Fronth (born 1963), a visual artist, photographer and painter
 Bjarte Tjøstheim (born 1967) a Norwegian comedian, radio host and actor
 Lene Elise Bergum (born 1971) a Norwegian actress
 Bjarte Breiteig (born 1974) a Norwegian short story writer
 Anne Lilia Berge Strand (born 1977) known as "Annie", a singer-songwriter
 Tom Hugo (born 1979) a Norwegian singer-songwriter
 Agnes Kittelsen (born 1980), an actress
 Frida Aasen, (born 1994) a Norwegian fashion model 
 Thea Sofie Loch Næss (born 1996) a Norwegian actress
 Helene Abildsnes, (Norwegian Wiki) (born 1998) Miss Universe Norway 2019

Sport 
 Gunn Margit Andreassen (born 1973) a former biathlete, twice Olympic relay team medallist
 Steinar Pedersen (born 1975) a former Norwegian footballer with 426 club caps
 Katrine Lunde (born 1980) a handball goalkeeper, 305 caps with Norway women 
 twins Katrine Lunde & Kristine Lunde-Borgersen, (born 1980) handball players, twice Olympic champions
 Andreas Thorkildsen (born 1982), a javelin thrower, Olympic gold medallist in 2004 and 2008
 Kristoffer Hæstad (born 1983) a former footballer with over 300 club caps and 27 for Norway

Twin towns – sister cities

Kristiansand is twinned with:

 Gdynia, Poland
 Kerava, Finland
 Letchworth, England, United Kingdom
 Münster, Germany
 Orléans, France
 Rajshahi, Bangladesh
 Reykjanesbær, Iceland
 Trollhättan, Sweden
 Walvis Bay, Namibia

See also
Fortifications of Kristiansand
Kristiansands Stiftsavis og Adressekontors-Efterretninger
List of boroughs of Kristiansand
List of lighthouses in Norway
Sørlandet

Notes

References

External links

Municipal fact sheet from Statistics Norway 
What's on in Kristiansand
Kristiansand Virtual Tour, 360* Panoramic Pictures (QTVR) 

 
Populated coastal places in Norway
Kristiansand region
Municipalities of Agder
Cities and towns in Norway
Populated places established in 1641
1641 establishments in Norway
Seaside resorts in Norway
Port cities and towns in Norway
Port cities and towns of the North Sea
Skagerrak